Humphrey is a town in Cattaraugus County, New York, United States. The population was 701 at the 2020 census. The town is named after Charles Humphrey, who at the time of the town's founding was Speaker of the New York State Assembly.

Humphrey is an interior town in the eastern half of the county, northeast of the city of Salamanca.

History 

The area that would become the town was first settled circa 1815. The town of Humphrey was established in 1836 from a part of the town of Allegany.

Geography

New York State Route 98 crosses the northwest corner of the town. Humphrey is primarily served by county roads, namely Routes 18, 19, and 51.

Adjacent towns and areas 
Humphrey is east of the town of Great Valley and south of the town of Franklinville. The east town line is shared by the towns of Hinsdale and Ischua. To the south is the town of Allegany.

Demographics

As of the census of 2000, there were 721 people, 263 households, and 186 families residing in the town.  The population density was 19.7 people per square mile (7.6/km2).  There were 457 housing units at an average density of 12.5 per square mile (4.8/km2).  The racial makeup of the town was 97.23% White, 0.97% African American, 0.83% Native American, 0.69% from other races, and 0.28% from two or more races. Hispanic or Latino of any race were 0.83% of the population.

There were 263 households, out of which 37.6% had children under the age of 18 living with them, 56.7% were married couples living together, 7.6% had a female householder with no husband present, and 28.9% were non-families. 22.1% of all households were made up of individuals, and 9.5% had someone living alone who was 65 years of age or older.  The average household size was 2.74 and the average family size was 3.22.

In the town, the population was spread out, with 27.6% under the age of 18, 8.6% from 18 to 24, 28.6% from 25 to 44, 24.1% from 45 to 64, and 11.1% who were 65 years of age or older.  The median age was 36 years. For every 100 females, there were 107.8 males.  For every 100 females age 18 and over, there were 109.6 males.

The median income for a household in the town was $35,313, and the median income for a family was $35,795. Males had a median income of $27,768 versus $20,326 for females. The per capita income for the town was $16,874.  About 9.2% of families and 11.3% of the population were below the poverty line, including 14.4% of those under age 18 and 8.5% of those age 65 or over.

Communities and locations in Humphrey 
Humphrey – The hamlet of Humphrey is near the center of the town at the junction of County Roads 18 and 51. It was formerly known as "Chapellsburg" after an early hotel owner; another possible factor in its name was the Saint Pacificus Chapel, a Roman Catholic chapel and cemetery that is the only church in North America named for Saint Pacificus and an early congregation point for the Franciscans that later founded Saint Bonaventure University. The chapel remains in operation to the present day, albeit in a reduced schedule since 2007 since the death of its longtime priest and cutbacks in the Catholic Church.
Humphrey Center – A hamlet in the northern part of the town on County Road 18. The community is locally called "Tickletown"; more about Tickletown can be found here.
Wrights Creek – A stream flowing past Humphrey and Humphrey Center. It is named after early settler Richard Wright.
Pumpkinville – An autumn theme park, pumpkin patch and apple cider mill based in the western part of the town.

References

External links
 Town of Humphrey official website
  Early history of Humphrey

Towns in Cattaraugus County, New York